Patrick Mouaya (born July 6, 1984) is a Congolese former professional footballer who played as a defender.

External links
 
 
 

Living people
1985 births
Sportspeople from Brazzaville
Association football defenders
Republic of the Congo footballers
FC Oberneuland players
Hallescher FC players
3. Liga players